Leo Scullion (born 10 April 1958) is a professional snooker referee from Glasgow, Scotland, who has been officiating on the main tour since 1999.

Career
After spending many years of his life as a taxi driver, and later a policeman, Scullion qualified as a professional referee in the 1990s.

His first senior match was in the 1999 Challenge Tour, and he officiated his first televised match in the 2001 Regal Scottish Masters, a tie between Stephen Lee and Patrick Wallace.

Scullion started to become a snooker personality in the 2000s and eventually officiated his first final in 2011, at the China Open. He then took charge of another two finals the following year, at the World Open and the UK Championship respectively. He officiated his first World Championship final in 2019.

Personal life
In a 2010 interview with World Snooker, Scullion stated that his hobbies include "Golf, TV, and Snooker", going on to claim that he had made a highest break of 93.

Scullion is currently living in East Kilbride, Scotland.

In December 2014, Scullion was being treated for cancer. As of March 2019 his lung cancer has been in remission for five years.

References

1958 births
Living people
Snooker referees and officials
British taxi drivers
Police officers from Glasgow
Sportspeople from Glasgow
Scottish referees and umpires